Jawaharlal Nehru University may refer to:

 Jawaharlal Nehru University, a central university in New Delhi, India
 Jawaharlal Nehru Technological University, Anantapur, a technical university in Anantapur, Andhra Pradesh, India
 Jawaharlal Nehru Technological University, Hyderabad, a technical university in Hyderabad, Telangana, India
 Jawaharlal Nehru Technological University, Kakinada, a technical university in Kakinada, Andhra Pradesh, India
 Jawaharlal Nehru Agricultural University, an agriculture university in Jabalpur, Madhya Pradesh, India
 Jawaharlal Nehru Architecture and Fine Arts University, an arts university in Hyderabad, Telangana, India